Luiza Helena de Bairros (27 March 1953 – 12 July 2016) was a Brazilian administrator and sociologist. She was the chief minister of the Special Secretariat for Policies to Promote Racial Equality between 2011 and 2014.

Biography 
Bairros was born in Porto Alegre but made her political career in the state of Bahia. She held a business degree from the Federal University of Rio Grande do Sul, a master's degree in social sciences from the Federal University of Bahia and a doctorate in sociology from the University of Michigan.

Bairros participated in United Nations Development Programme projects to fight racism. From 2008, she was the Bahia State Secretary of Racial Equality Promotion under governor Jaques Wagner, when she was invited by President Dilma Rousseff to join her cabinet in 2011.

Bairros died on 12 July 2016 of lung cancer.

References 

Afro-Brazilian people
Federal University of Rio Grande do Sul alumni
2016 deaths
1953 births
Brazilian sociologists
20th-century Brazilian women politicians
21st-century Brazilian women politicians
University of Michigan College of Literature, Science, and the Arts alumni
Deaths from lung cancer in Brazil